Czeremcha  (Cheremkha) is a village in Hajnówka County, Podlaskie Voivodeship, in eastern Poland, close to the border with Belarus. It is the seat of the gmina (administrative district) called Gmina Czeremcha. The village has a population of 2,500.

It is a rail junction, with connections going westwards to Siedlce, northwards to Bielsk Podlaski and eastwards to Hajnówka. At the start of World War II it was the site of an aerial bombardment described by journalist Mendel Moses.

References

Czeremcha